Kitty was a French vessel taken in prize c. 1810. She became a West Indiaman and then, following a change of ownership, a privateer. She was one of only two British privateers to target slave traders.

British career
Kitty enters Lloyd's Register in 1810.

John Roach acquired Kitty in 1811. He received a letter of marque for her on 2 October 1812.

In early 1813 Kitty captured three slave ships off Sierra Leone, all of which she took into Freetown where the Vice admiralty court condemned them:

The need to put prize crews aboard San Jose Triumfo and Phoenix strained Roach's resources.

Fate
Lloyd's List reported on 27 May 1814 that Kitty had been totally lost sometime in February off the coast of Africa while chasing a Spanish vessel. An English slave trader called Crawford was working with a Spanish schooner carrying slaves that Crawford had gathered. The schooner captured Kitty and the schooner's master murdered Roach. The Spaniards plundered Kitty before scuttling her. The schooner also enslaved the black crew on Kitty, including two freed Negroes from Sierra Leone, and sold them into slavery at Havana.  rescued the surviving crew members and captured Crawford's launch and trade goods, but was unable to capture either Crawford or the Spanish schooner.

Citations and references
Citations

References
 
 

1805 ships
Captured ships
Privateer ships of the United Kingdom
African slave trade
Maritime incidents in 1814
Age of Sail merchant ships
Merchant ships of the United Kingdom